The year 2019 is the 7th year in the history of the Absolute Championship Akhmat, a mixed martial arts, kickboxing and Brazilian jiu-jitsu promotion based in Russia.

ACA 2019 Awards 
The following fighters won the Absolute Championship Akhmat year-end awards for 2019:
ACA Fight of the Year 2019: Marat Balaev vs. Salman Zhamaldaev 
ACA Fighter of the Year 2019: Albert Tumenov
ACA Knockout of the Year 2019: Arman Ospanov 
ACA Submission of the Year 2019: Khusein Shaikhaev 
ACA Discovery of the Year 2019: Shamil Shakhbulatov

List of events

ACA MMA

ACA KB

ACA 91: Agujev vs. Silvério

Absolute Championship Akhmat 91: Agujev vs. Silvério will be a mixed martial arts event held by Absolute Championship Akhmat on January 26, 2019 at the Sports Hall Coliseum in Grozny, Russia.

Background
This event featured a welterweight bout between Arbi Agujev and former UFC fighter Elias Silvério served as the event headliner.

Bonus awards:
 
The following fighters will be awarded $10,000 bonuses:
Fight of the Night: Mansur Khatuev vs. Felipe Silva 
Knockout of the Night: Shamil Shakhbulatov

Results

ACA 92: Yagshimuradov vs. Celiński

Absolute Championship Akhmat 92: Yagshimuradov vs. Celiński was a mixed martial arts event held by Absolute Championship Akhmat on February 16, 2019 at the Hala Torwar in Warsaw, Poland.

Background
Marcin Held was scheduled to face Abdul-Aziz Abdulvakhabov, but Held was forced off the card on February 5 with an injury. Brian Foster served as Held's replacement.

Bonus awards:
 
The following fighters will be awarded $10,000 bonuses:
Fight of the Night: Piotr Strus vs Ibragim Chuzhigaev
Knockout of the Night: Jorge Gonzalez 
$5000 Stoppage Victory Bonuses: Aslambek Saidov, Abdul-Aziz Abdulvakhabov, Tony Johnson, Döwletjan Ýagşymyradow

Results

ACA KB 18: Battle of Tolstoy-Yurt

Absolute Championship Akhmat Kickboxing 18: Battle of Tolstoy-Yurt was a Kickboxing event held by Absolute Championship Akhmat on March 2, 2019 at the Sports Hall Coliseum in Grozny, Russia.

Background

Bonus awards:
 
The following fighters will be awarded $5,000 bonuses:
Fight of the Night:
Knockout of the Night:
Submission of the Night:
$5000 Stoppage Victory Bonuses:

Results

ACA 93: Balaev vs. Zhamaldaev

Absolute Championship Akhmat 93: Balaev vs. Zhamaldaev was a mixed martial arts event held by Absolute Championship Akhmat on March 16, 2019 at the Sibur Arena in Saint Petersburg, Russia.

Background
This event feature two title fights, first the former ACB featherweight champion Marat Balaev will face the WFCA featherweight champion Salman Zhamaldaev to determine the ACA featherweight champion as the event headliner. And the ACB bantamweight champions Rustam Kerimov and WFCA bantamweight champions Abdul-Rakhman Dudaev will collide to unify titles and determine the ACA bantamweight champion as co-headliner.

Timur Nagibin was set to fight with Lambert Akhiadov but he has to withdraw the day before the fight due to health issues. As a result of this, the fight was canceled.

Bonus awards:
 
The following fighters will be awarded $10,000 bonuses:
Fight of the Night: Marat Balaev vs. Salman Zhamaldaev
Submission of the Night: Khamzat Aushev
$5000 Stoppage Victory Bonuses: Kurban Gadzhiev, Rene Pessoa, Tural Ragimov, Amir Aliakbari

Results

ACA 94: Bagov vs. Khaliev

Absolute Championship Akhmat 94: Bagov vs. Khaliev was a mixed martial arts event held by Absolute Championship Akhmat on March 30, 2019 at the Basket-Hall in Krasnodar, Russia.

Background
This event was set to feature a unification bout between the ACB lightweight champion Ali Bagov and the WFCA lightweight champion Khusein Khaliev to determine the ACA lightweight champion as the event headliner. However at the weigh-ins, Bagov weighed in at 72 kilograms, 1.75 kilograms over the lightweight limit for a title fight. Bagov was given additional time to make weight, but he refused to do so. The ACA commission explained to Bagov that because he missed weight the bout will proceed as a non-title contest. Bagov refused to fight, that forced the fight to be cancelled. He was suspended for 6 months for breach of contract.

The ACB heavyweight champions Mukhumat Vakhaev was set to face WFCA heavyweight champions Evgeniy Goncharov in the co-main event for ACB/WFCA unification bout. But Vakhaev was pulled from the card due to illness, that forced the fight to be cancelled.

The WFCA welterweight champion Murad Abdullaev was set to fight with the ACB welterweight champion Albert Tumenov, but Abdullaev has to withdraw due to health issues. As a result of this, the title unification fight was moved to ACA 95.

Adrick Croes faced Isa Umarov at ACB 94. He replaced Nicolae Negumereanu who signed with the UFC earlier this month.

Bonus awards:
 
The following fighters will be awarded $10,000 bonuses:
Fight of the Night: Islam Meshev vs. Nashkho Galaev
Submission of the Night: Isa Umarov
$5000 Stoppage Victory Bonuses: Ramazan Kishev, Ioannis Arzoumanidis

Results

ACA 95: Tumenov vs. Abdulaev

Absolute Championship Akhmat 95: Tumenov vs. Abdulaev was a mixed martial arts event held by Absolute Championship Akhmat on April 27, 2019 at the VTB Ice Palace in Moscow, Russia.

Background
Azam Gaforov was scheduled to face Yunus Evloev for the vacant ACA Flyweight Championship, but Gaforov was forced off the card on march 4 with an injury. Josiel Silva served as Gaforov replacement.

Batraz Agnaev was scheduled to fight against Cory Hendricks but Hendricks suffered an injury during training and was forced to withdraw from the fight. Evgeniy Egemberdiev has stepped in on short notice against Agnaev.

Rasul Mirzaev has suffered fingers injury during training and has been unable to compete, that forced his fight against Felipe Froes to be cancelled.

Alexander Peduson was supposed to face Fatkhidin Sobirov. However, Peduson suffered an injury during training and was forced to withdraw from the fight. Cleverson Silva has stepped in on short notice against Sobirov.

Bonus awards:
 
The following fighters will be awarded $10,000 bonuses:
Fight of the Night: Beslan Ushukov vs. Gadzhimurad Khiramagomedov
Knockout of the Night: Arman Ospanov
$5000 Stoppage Victory Bonuses: Ilya Sheglov, Evgeniy Egemberdiev, Sergey Bilostenniy, Magomed Ismailov, Salamu Abdurahmanov

Results

ACA 96: Goncharov vs. Johnson

Absolute Championship Akhmat 96: Goncharov vs. Johnson was a mixed martial arts event held by Absolute Championship Akhmat on June 8, 2019 at the Łódź Sport Arena in Łódź, Poland.

Background

Bonus awards:
 
The following fighters will be awarded $10,000 bonuses:
Knockout of the Night: Luke Barnatt
Submission of the Night: Rodolfo Vieira
$5000 Stoppage Victory Bonuses: Radoslaw Paczuski, Daniel Omielańczuk, Arseniy Sultanov, Carlos Eduardo

Results

ACA 98: Khazhirokov vs. Henrique

Absolute Championship Akhmat 98: Khazhirokov vs. Henrique was a mixed martial arts event held by Absolute Championship Akhmat on August 31, 2019 at the Basket-Hall in Krasnodar, Russia.

Background

Bonus awards:
 
The following fighters will be awarded $10,000 bonuses:
Fight of the Night: Rasul Shovhalov  vs. Efrain Escudero 
Knockout of the Night: Andrey Goncharov
Submission of the Night: Ruslan Abiltarov
$5000 Stoppage Victory Bonuses: Kyle Reyes, Maycon Silvan, Tural Ragimov, Aurel Pîrtea, Charles Henrique

Results

ACA 97: Goncharov vs. Johnson 2

Absolute Championship Akhmat 97: Goncharov vs. Johnson 2 was a mixed martial arts event held by Absolute Championship Akhmat on August 31, 2019 at the Basket-Hall in Krasnodar, Russia.

Background
Hacran Dias was to challenge Yusuf Raisov at this event, but had to withdraw due to undisclosed reasons. He was replaced by Joao Luiz Nogueira, who stepped in on short notice for this encounter.

Arbi Agujev was scheduled to face Bruno Santos, but Agujev was forced off the card due to undisclosed reasons. Vycheslav Babkin served as Agujev's replacement.

A featherweight bout between Adlan Bataev and Mukhamed Kokov was previously scheduled for ACA 97. However, Kokov pulled out of the fight due to weight issues and the bout was scrapped.

Bonus awards:
 
The following fighters will be awarded $10,000 bonuses:
Fight of the Night: Goga Shamatava vs. Azamat Kerefov
Knockout of the Night: Apti Bimarzaev
$5000 Stoppage Victory Bonuses: Islam Meshev, Nasrudin Nasrudinov, Denis Smoldarev, Vyacheslav Babkin, Aleksei Butorin, Nikola Dipchikov

Results

ACA 99: Bagov vs. Khaliev

Absolute Championship Akhmat 99: Bagov vs. Khaliev will be a mixed martial arts event held by Absolute Championship Akhmat on September 27, 2019 at the VTB Arena in Moscow, Russia.

Background
Frantz Slioa was expected to face Musa Khamanaev at this event. However, Khamanaev tipped the scales at 69.4 kilos at the official weigh-ins on Thursday. His bout with Slioa was subsequently canceled, per ACB.

At the weigh-ins, Imanali Gamzatkhanov, Baz Mohammad Mubariz and Adam Townsend all missed weight for their respective bouts. They were fined.

Bonus awards:
 
The following fighters will be awarded $10,000 bonuses:
Fight of the Night: Magomed Ismailov vs. Artem Frolov
Knockout of the Night: Shamil Shakhbulatov
Submission of the Night: Abdul-Rakhmad Dudaev
$5000 Stoppage Victory Bonuses: Sharaf Davlatmurodov, Ibragim Chuzhigaev, Alexey Polpudnikov, Murad Abdulaev, Abdul-Aziz Abdulvakhabov, Ali Bagov

Results

ACA 100: Zhamaldaev vs. Froes 2

Absolute Championship Akhmat 100: Zhamaldaev vs. Froes 2 will be a mixed martial arts event held by Absolute Championship Akhmat on October 4, 2019 at the Sports Hall Coliseum in Grozny, Russia.

Background
A bantamweight bout between Dileno Lopes and Khuseyn Sheikhaev was previously scheduled for this card. However, Lopes pulled out of the fight due to visa issue and the bout was scrapped.

Khamzat Aushev was scheduled to face Zhorobek Teshebaev, but Aushev was forced off the card due to health issue, the bout was scrapped.

Yusup Umarov  was expected to face Magomedsaygid Alibekov at this event. However, Alibekov tipped the scales at 75 kilos at the official weigh-ins on Thursday, 5 kilos overweight. His bout with Umarov was subsequently canceled, per ACA.

Bonus awards:
 
The following fighters will be awarded $10,000 bonuses:
Fight of the Night: Felipe Froes vs. Salman Zhamaldaev
Knockout of the Night: Imran Bukuev
Submission of the Night: Rasul Albaskhanov
$5000 Stoppage Victory Bonuses: Akhmed Musakaev, Khasein Shaikhaev, Adlan Mamaev, Herdeson Batista, Artem Reznikov, Askhab Zulaev, Asylzhan Bakhytzhanuly,  Ustarmagomed Gadzhidaudov, Magomedrasul Khasbulaev, Magomed Bibulatov

Results

ACA 100: Fight Day

ACA 100

ACA 101: Strus vs. Nemchinov

Absolute Championship Akhmat 101: Strus vs. Nemchinov was a mixed martial arts event held by Absolute Championship Akhmat on November 15, 2019 at the Expo XXI in Warsaw, Poland.

Background
Alexander Peduson has been forced to withdraw from his scheduled fight against Rob Emerson due to undisclosed reasons. Emerson instead faced the Brazilian Dileno Lopes, who stepped in on short notice for this encounter.

Bonus awards:
 
The following fighters will be awarded $10,000 bonuses:
Knockout of the Night: Daniel Omielańczuk
$5000 Stoppage Victory Bonuses: Dileno Lopes, Alikhan Vakhaev, Lom-Ali Eskiev, Radosław Paczuski

Results

ACA 102: Tumenov vs. Ushukov

Absolute Championship Akhmat 102: Tumenov vs. Ushukov was a mixed martial arts event held by Absolute Championship Akhmat on November 29, 2019 at the Almaty Arena in Almaty, Kazakhstan.

Background
Augusto Mendes was supposed to face Nursultan Kasymkhanov. However, Mendes suffered an injury during training and was forced to withdraw from the fight. Aleksander Peduson has stepped in on two weeks notice against Kasymkhanov.

Evgeniy Egemberdiev was expected to face Jose Daniel Toledo at the event, but pulled out of the bout on January 11 due to a back injury. He was replaced by Almanbet Nuraly.

Bonus awards:
 
The following fighters will be awarded $10,000 bonuses:
Fight of the Night: Nursultan Kassymkhanov vs. Alexander Peduson
Knockout of the Night: Albert Tumenov
Submission of the Night: Khusein Sheikhaev
$5000 Stoppage Victory Bonuses: Jose Daniel Toledo, Altynbek Mamashev, Carlos Eduardo, Cory Hendricks, Zharabek Teshebaev, Roggers Souza, Salamu Abdurahmanov

Results

ACA 103: Yagshimuradov vs. Butorin

Absolute Championship Akhmat 103: Yagshimuradov vs. Butorin will be a mixed martial arts event held by Absolute Championship Akhmat on December 14, 2019 in Saint Petersburg, Russia.

Background
Hacran Dias dropped out of his fight with  Yusuf Raisov due to injury. Raimundo Batista served as Dias replacement, takes short notice fight against Raisov.

Bonus awards:
 
The following fighters were awarded $10,000 bonuses:
Fight of the Night: Kurban Taigibov vs. Abdul-Rakhman Temirov 
Fight of the Night: Igor Zhirkov vs. Mikhail Malyutin
Knockout of the Night: Alexander Sarnavskiy
$5000 Stoppage Victory Bonuses: Rodrigo Praia, Yusuf Raisov, Rustam Kerimov

Fight Card

See also
 2019 in UFC
 2019 in Bellator MMA
 2019 in ONE Championship 
 2019 in M-1 Global
 2019 in Konfrontacja Sztuk Walki
 2019 in RXF

References

External links
ACA

Absolute Championship Akhmat
Absolute Championship Berkut events
2019 in mixed martial arts
2019 sport-related lists
January 2019 sports events in Russia